Juliaen Teniers or Juliaan Teniers (Antwerp 1572–1615) was a Flemish painter of figures and flower pieces.  He was a member of the extended Teniers family of painters.

Life
He was born in Antwerp as the son of Juliaan Teniers, originally from Ath and his father's second wife Joanna van Maelbeke. His father was a successful silk merchant who owned a house on the Handschoenmarkt in Antwerp.  David had one sister and four brothers of whom David Teniers the Elder became a successful painter.  He was the uncle of David Teniers the Younger.

He married Suzanna Coignet, the sister of the painter Gillis II Coignet on 23 April 1595. The couple had at least three children: Jan Baptist, Melchior en Joanna.

Juliaan Teniers became a master of the Guild of St. Luke in 1595 and he joined the Gilde van de Armenbus (Guild of the Poor Box), a sort of collective insurance pool for artists in need which also played a social role. He and his wife lived in the Koningstraat until 1597, when they bought the house De Roos in the Vaartstraat. Between 1595 and 1608 he had at least eleven pupils, of whom only Gaspar van den Hoecke and his half brother David the Elder still have any claim to fame.

Juliaan Teniers died shortly before 11 March 1615.

Work
He was known as a figure painter and painter of flower pieces. Together with David Juliaan painted scenes for plays performed during the Joyous Entry of the Archdukes in Antwerp. His paintings are deemed lost and only known through inventories. These inventories also make clear that he sometimes cooperated with Joos de Momper and Claes van Cleve.

Sources

References 

17th-century Flemish painters
Flemish genre painters
Flemish still life painters
Artists from Antwerp
Painters from Antwerp
1572 births
1615 deaths